Hewlett House is a historic home located at Cold Spring Harbor in Suffolk County, New York, United States. It is a two-story, gable roofed dwelling built about 1815 and enlarged in the 1870s.  It features a one-story, shed roof front porch with a bracketed cornice and square columns.

It was added to the National Register of Historic Places in 1985.

References

Houses on the National Register of Historic Places in New York (state)
Houses completed in 1815
Houses in Suffolk County, New York
National Register of Historic Places in Suffolk County, New York